Avanhard Stadium is number of stadiums in Ukraine. All the stadiums were part of the Soviet sports society of Ukrainian industries Avanhard. In 1987, along with Spartak and other sports societies, it was merged into the sport society of Trade Unions that existed until the fall of the Soviet Union.

It may refer to:

 Avanhard Stadium (Luhansk) in Luhansk, Ukraine
 Avanhard Stadium (Uzhhorod) in Uzhhorod, Ukraine
 Avanhard Stadium (Lutsk) in Lutsk, Ukraine
 Avanhard Stadium (Rivne) in Rivne, Ukraine
 Avanhard Stadium (Pripyat) in Pripyat, Ukraine
 Avanhard Stadium (Yalta) in Yalta, Ukraine

Renamed stadiums
 Prapor Stadium in Kramatorsk, Ukraine, in 2011–2017 was known as Avanhard Stadium
 Ternopilsky Misky Stadion, in Ternopil, Ukraine, used to be known as Avanhard

See also
 Avangard Stadium, in Petropavl, Kazakhstan
 Avangard Stadium, in Vyborg, Russia

Avanhard (sports society)
Sports venues in Ukraine